The Musings of Miles is the first 12" LP record by Miles Davis. It was issued by Prestige Records in September 1955, following several LPs issued in the 10 inch format. The six tracks were all recorded at Rudy Van Gelder's home studio on June 7, 1955.

Pianist Red Garland and drummer Philly Joe Jones would go on to join Miles' First Great Quintet, that would record later in 1955.
"A Night in Tunisia" features Jones playing with special drum sticks which had bells riveted to the shaft.

Reception
The AllMusic review by Scott Yanow called it "likable if not essential music."

Track listing

Personnel
Miles Davis – trumpet
Red Garland – piano
Oscar Pettiford – bass
Philly Joe Jones – drums

References

Prestige Records LP 7007 (1955)
Prestige 30651 (CD)

External links
The Musings of Miles Ira Gitler liner notes

Miles Davis albums
1955 albums
Prestige Records albums
Albums produced by Bob Weinstock
Albums recorded at Van Gelder Studio